William Edwardes, 4th Baron Kensington PC (11 May 1835 – 7 October 1896), also 1st Baron Kensington in the Peerage of the United Kingdom, styled The Honourable William Edwardes between 1852 and 1872, was a British landowner and Liberal politician. He notably served as Comptroller of the Household from 1880 to 1885 and as Captain of the Yeomen of the Guard from 1892 to 1895.

Background
Edwardes was the eldest son of Captain William Edwardes, 3rd Baron Kensington, by his wife Laura Jane Ellison, daughter of Cuthbert Ellison, of Hebburn Hall, Hebburn, County Durham.

Political career
Edwardes was elected to the House of Commons for Haverfordwest in 1868, a seat he held until 1885. In 1872 he succeeded his father as fourth Baron Kensington but as this was an Irish peerage it did not entitle him to a seat in the House of Lords and he was able to remain a member of the House of Commons. When the Liberals came to power in 1880 under William Ewart Gladstone, Kensington was admitted to the Privy Council and appointed Comptroller of the Household (government whip in the House of Commons), a post he held until the government fell in 1885.

Following the abolition of his Haverfordwest constituency in 1885, Kensington sought election for Hornsey, but was unsuccessful.

In 1886, he was created Baron Kensington, of Kensington in the County of Middlesex, in the Peerage of the United Kingdom, which gave him a seat in the House of Lords. The same year the Liberals returned to power under Gladstone, and Kensington served briefly as a Lord-in-waiting (government whip in the House of Lords) from March until the fall of the government in July. The Liberals were out of office for the next six years, but returned to power in 1892, when Gladstone appointed him Captain of the Yeomen of the Guard. He retained this office when Lord Rosebery became Prime Minister in 1894. The Liberal government fell the following year, and Kensington never returned to office. Apart from his political career he also held the honorary post of Lord Lieutenant of Pembrokeshire between 1872 and 1896.

Local government
Kensington was elected to Pembrokeshire County Council at the first county elections in 1889. He presided at the first meeting of the council and was immediately elected an alderman.

Family
Lord Kensington married Grace Elizabeth Johnstone-Douglas, daughter of Robert Johnstone-Douglas, in 1867. They had four sons and five daughters. He died in October 1896, aged 61, and was succeeded in the barony by his eldest son, William. Lady Kensington died in 1910. Their daughter, Sylvia, married Lord Edward Gleichen in the same year.

Death
Lord Kensington died suddenly on 7 October 1896 while taking part in a shooting expedition at Floors Castle, Roxburghshire, Scotland.

References

External links
 

1835 births
1896 deaths
Barons in the Peerage of Ireland
Kensington, William Edwardes, 1st Baron
Liberal Party (UK) MPs for Welsh constituencies
Liberal Party (UK) Lords-in-Waiting
Lord-Lieutenants of Pembrokeshire
Members of the Privy Council of the United Kingdom
UK MPs 1868–1874
UK MPs 1874–1880
UK MPs 1880–1885
UK MPs who inherited peerages
UK MPs who were granted peerages
Members of the Parliament of the United Kingdom for Pembrokeshire constituencies
Peers of the United Kingdom created by Queen Victoria